Tour of Quanzhou Bay is a men's multi-day cycling race which takes place in China. It is rated as a 2.2 event on UCI Asia Tour.

Overall winners

References

Cycle races in China
UCI Asia Tour races